Dizgaran or Dizgeran or Dizgoran may refer to:
 Dizgaran, Kermanshah
 Dizgaran, Eslamabad-e Gharb, Kermanshah Province